Ezequiel Rodríguez (born April 11, 1977), is an Argentine actor.

Filmography

References

External links 
 

Argentine male actors
Living people
1977 births
20th-century Argentine male actors
Male actors from Buenos Aires